Aa Gale Lag Jaa is 1994 Hindi language romantic thriller film directed by Hamid Ali Khan and starring Jugal Hansraj, Urmila Matondkar, Paresh Rawal, Ashok Saraf, Ajit, Reema Lagoo, Raza Murad, Arjun and Gulshan Grover.

The film marked the first leading role for Jugal Hansraj, who previously was a child artist in several films in the 1980s. Coincidentally, he was paired with Urmila Matondkar who had played his sister in his debut film Masoom (1983).

Plot
Suraj (Jugal Hansraj) is a poor boy raised by his uncle Mamtaram (Paresh Rawal). Roshni (Urmila Matondkar) is a rich girl raised by her widowed aunt Shakuntala Devi (Reema Lagoo). Roshni & Suraj fall in love, but Shakuntala opposes the marriage on knowing that Suraj is the son of the driver of Roshni's father, who also happened to be his murderer. Mamtaram confirms that his real father was indeed in prison, but he was killed on release by a speeding truck.

Suraj's dreams are shattered. Suddenly, someone starts killing Roshni's father's business partners. Suspicion points towards Suraj. The murder cases are assigned to a weird Police Inspector Ram Bhajan Singh (Gulshan Grover). After realizing that killer is some third person nobody knows about, the Inspector arranges a trap for him.

It is found that the killer is Suraj's supposedly dead father. He tells everybody that the real killers were Roshni's father's business partners who were afraid that her father would expose their frauds. They framed Suraj's father who tried to remove the knife out of his masters body. Before the Inspector can arrest him, Suraj's father finds the last partner in the hospital and kills him. He cut face off Plasic surgery. Suraj's father surrenders to the police and the film ends.

Cast
 Jugal Hansraj as Suraj
 Urmila Matondkar as Roshni 
 Paresh Rawal as Mamtaram, Suraj's uncle
 Ashok Saraf as Dhaniram
 Ajit as Kalka Singh
 Reema Lagoo as Shakuntala Devi, Roshni Mother
 Arun Bali as Seth Mohanlal
 Raza Murad as  Advocate Jagatpal Sharma
 Ranjeet as Dr. Avinash Mathur
 Roopesh Kumar as Satish Khanna
 Arjun as Sikander Khanna
 Gulshan Grover as Police Inspector Ram Bhajan Singh
 Dinesh Hingoo as Police Constable Baakelal

Soundtrack
The film is remembered for its melodious songs by Anu Malik.

References

External links
 

1994 films
1990s Hindi-language films
Films scored by Anu Malik
Indian romantic thriller films
Indian psychological thriller films